The Americans is an American period spy drama television series created by Joe Weisberg that aired on the FX television network for six seasons from January 30, 2013, to May 30, 2018. Weisberg and Joel Fields also served as showrunners and executive producers. Set during the Cold War, the show follows Elizabeth (Keri Russell) and Philip Jennings (Matthew Rhys), two Soviet KGB intelligence officers posing as an American married couple living in Falls Church, a Virginia suburb of Washington, D.C., with their American-born children Paige (Holly Taylor) and Henry (Keidrich Sellati). It also explores the conflict between Washington's FBI office and the KGB Rezidentura there, from the perspectives of agents on both sides, including the Jennings' neighbor Stan Beeman (Noah Emmerich), an FBI agent working in counterintelligence. The series begins in the aftermath of the inauguration of President Ronald Reagan in January 1981 and concludes in December 1987, shortly before the leaders of the United States and the Soviet Union signed the Intermediate-Range Nuclear Forces Treaty.

The Americans was acclaimed by critics, many of whom considered it among the best of its era; its writing, characters, and acting were often singled out. The series's final season earned Rhys the Primetime Emmy Award for Outstanding Lead Actor in a Drama Series, while Weisberg and Fields won Outstanding Writing for a Drama Series; it also received the Golden Globe Award for Best Television Series – Drama. Margo Martindale twice won the Primetime Emmy Award for Outstanding Guest Actress in a Drama Series for her performances in the third and fourth seasons. It was one of the rare drama shows to receive two Peabody Awards during its run.

Episodes

Cast and characters
The surnames of most of the Russian characters are not revealed. In scenes in the Soviet embassy, the characters address each other in a familiar but respectful manner, using given name and patronymic, without mentioning surnames. (For example, "Ivanovich" means "son of Ivan" and "Sergeevna" means "daughter of Sergei".)

Main

 Keri Russell as Elizabeth Jennings (Nadezhda), a KGB officer and wife of Philip. In comparison to Philip, Elizabeth's allegiance to the KGB and the Soviet Union, as well as the ideology of communism, is stronger and more straightforward.
 Matthew Rhys as Philip Jennings (Mischa), a KGB officer and husband of Elizabeth. Although loyal to his cause, Philip holds little animosity towards the United States. Philip is close friends with Stan Beeman. As Clark, one of his false identities, Philip romances Martha, an FBI secretary, to obtain classified information.
 Maximiliano Hernández as Chris Amador, Stan's FBI partner (season 1)
 Holly Taylor as Paige Jennings, Elizabeth and Philip's daughter
 Keidrich Sellati as Henry Jennings, Elizabeth and Philip's son
 Noah Emmerich as Stan Beeman, an FBI counterintelligence agent and the Jennings' neighbor. Unaware of the Jennings' true nature, he is very close with the family and best friends with Philip.
Annet Mahendru as Nina Sergeevna Krilova, a clerical worker turned KGB agent at the Soviet Embassy, and Stan's former informant and lover (main seasons 2–4; recurring season 1)
 Susan Misner as Sandra Beeman, Stan's wife (main seasons 2–3, recurring seasons 1 and 4)
 Alison Wright as Martha Hanson, Agent Gaad's secretary and Philip's informant (main seasons 2–4; recurring seasons 1 and 5)
 Lev Gorn as Arkady Ivanovich Zotov, the KGB's Rezident at the Soviet embassy (main seasons 3–4; recurring seasons 1–2 and 6)
 Costa Ronin as Oleg Igorevich Burov, originally the Soviet embassy's Science and Technology officer, a privileged son of a government minister who was appointed thanks to his father's connections so he could enjoy the comforts of the United States; at the end of season 4, returned to the USSR after his brother's death, in the KGB at first and then at his father's ministry (main seasons 3–6; recurring season 2)
 Richard Thomas as Frank Gaad, an FBI Special Agent and Stan's supervisor (main seasons 3–4; recurring seasons 1–2)
 Dylan Baker as William Crandall, a Russian agent and biochemical warfare scientist (season 4)
 Brandon J. Dirden as Dennis Aderholt, an FBI agent (seasons 4–6)
 Margo Martindale as Claudia, the Jennings' second and fifth KGB handler (main season 6; recurring seasons 1–2, 4–5; guest season 3)

Recurring
 Daniel Flaherty as Matthew Beeman (seasons 1–5), Stan and Sandra's son
 Peter Von Berg as Vasili Nikolaevich (seasons 1–4), a former KGB Rezident
 Derek Luke as Gregory Thomas (season 1; special appearance season 6), an American militant and Elizabeth's longtime lover
 Wrenn Schmidt as Kate (season 2), the Jenningses' third KGB handler
 Lee Tergesen as Andrew Larrick (season 2), a United States Navy SEAL blackmailed into working for the KGB
 Michael Aronov as Anton Baklanov (seasons 2–4), an émigré Russian-Jewish scientist working on secret stealth technology
 Kelly AuCoin as Pastor Tim (seasons 2–6), a pastor who heads the church which Paige Jennings attends
 Frank Langella as Gabriel (seasons 3–5), the Jenningses' first and fourth KGB handler
 Vera Cherny as Tatiana Evgenyevna Vyazemtseva (seasons 3–6), a KGB officer at the Rezidentura
 Peter Mark Kendall as Hans (seasons 3–5), a South African member of the Jennings' operational team
 Julia Garner as Kimberly "Kimmy" Breland (seasons 3–6), the daughter of the head of the CIA's Afghan group, later head of the Soviet group
 Karen Pittman as Lisa (seasons 2–4), a Northrop employee from whom Elizabeth is gleaning information
 Laurie Holden as Renee (seasons 5–6), Stan's girlfriend and later wife
 Scott Cohen as Glenn Haskard (season 6), a member of a State Department negotiating team
 Miriam Shor as Erica Haskard (season 6), the ailing wife of Glenn Haskard for whom Elizabeth works as a home nurse and who coerces Elizabeth into art therapy

Production

Concept
The Americans, a period piece set during the Reagan administration, was outlined by series creator Joe Weisberg, a former CIA officer. The series focuses on the personal and professional lives of the Jennings family—a married couple of Soviet deep-cover agents placed in the Washington, D.C. area in the 1960s and their unsuspecting, American-born children. The story picks up in the early 1980s. The show's creator has described the series as being essentially about a marriage: "The Americans is at its core a marriage story. International relations is just an allegory for the human relations. Sometimes, when you're struggling in your marriage or with your kid, it feels like life or death. For Philip and Elizabeth, it often is." Joel Fields, the other executive producer, described the series as working different levels of reality: the fictional world of the marriage between Philip and Elizabeth, and the real world involving the characters' experiences during the Cold War.

In 2007, after leaving the CIA, Weisberg published An Ordinary Spy, a novel about a spy who is completing the final stages of his training in Virginia and is being transferred overseas. After reading Weisberg's novel, executive producer Graham Yost discovered that Weisberg had also written a pilot for a possible spy series. Weisberg was fascinated by stories he had heard from agents who served abroad as spies, while raising their families. He was interested in bringing that concept to television, with the idea of a family of spies, rather than just one person. Yost read the pilot and discovered that it was "annoyingly good", which led to developing the show.

Weisberg says the CIA inadvertently gave him the idea for a series about spies, explaining, "While I was taking the polygraph exam to get in, they asked the question, 'Are you joining the CIA in order to gain experience about the intelligence community so that you can write about it later'—which had never occurred to me. I was totally joining the CIA because I wanted to be a spy. But the second they asked that question ... then I thought, 'Now I'm going to fail the test. The job at CIA, which Weisberg later described as a mistake, has helped him develop several storylines in the series, basing some plot lines on real-life stories, and integrating tactics and methods he learned in his training, such as dead drops and communication protocols.

Weisberg was partially influenced by the 2010 events of the Illegals Program to write a pilot script for the series. His research material included notes on the KGB's Cold War left by Vasili Mitrokhin and conversations with some of his former colleagues at the CIA. However, in a departure from the circumstances involving the Illegals Program, he said he had opted to set the story in the early 1980s because "a modern day [setting] didn't seem like a good idea", adding, "People were both shocked and simultaneously shrugged at the [2010] scandal because it didn't seem like we were really enemies with Russia anymore. An obvious way to remedy that for television was to stick it back in the Cold War. At first, the '70s appealed to me just because I loved the hair and the music. But can you think of a better time than the '80s with Ronald Reagan yelling about the evil empire?" In a 2017 interview Weisberg said that the show tried hard to resist the influence of the current political climate: "What you don't want is for people watching the show and thinking 'Oh, those clever writers, they did little things here and there that have to do with Donald Trump or what's going on with Russia today'".

Casting
Weisberg said he had no idea about who would star in the series before casting began. FX president John Landgraf had the idea to cast Keri Russell in the series. Leslie Feldman, the head of casting at DreamWorks, saw Matthew Rhys in a play and suggested him to Weisberg. Russell and Rhys had met briefly at a party years before, but were not fully introduced. They both were attracted to the series because of its focus on the relationship between their characters. Said Rhys, "You have two people who have led the most incredibly strange life together with incredibly high stakes, in this scene of domesticity that is an absolute lie, and at the end of the pilot they're finding each other for the very first time."

Russell described the pilot script as "interesting", continuing, "It was so far from a procedural. And [originally,] I didn't know that I wanted to do it. I always say no to everything. I never want to do anything. [Laughs.] But I just couldn't stop thinking about it. I read it... and I kept trying to figure it out, because it's so not clear. It's still not clear to me. But there's so many different levels to it."

Rhys said of his character, "He's a sort of gift of a part in that he's very sort of layered and multi-faceted. And when you meet him, he's at this great turning point in his life where everything's changing for him. You just get to do everything. You get to do the kung fu, and you get to do the emotional scenes, you get to do the disguises. It's the full package for an actor. It's a dream."

Noah Emmerich was initially hesitant about taking a role in the series. He explained: "The truth is, from the very beginning, I thought, 'I don't want to do a TV show where I carry a gun or a badge. I'm done with guns and badges. I just don't want to do that anymore.' When I first read it I thought, 'Yeah, it's really interesting and really good, but I don't want to be an FBI guy.'" His friend, Gavin O'Connor, who directed the pilot episode, convinced him to take a closer look at the role. Emmerich stated that he responded to the aspect of marriage and family. "It was really interesting, and it was really intelligent and unusual, and it stood out from the pack."

After recurring in the first season, Susan Misner, Annet Mahendru, and Alison Wright, who play Sandra Beeman, Nina, and Martha Hanson, respectively, were promoted to series regulars beginning with season two. After recurring in the first two seasons, Lev Gorn, who plays Arkady Ivanovich, was promoted to series regular for season three.

Writing
Weisberg wrote the first two episodes of the series. Landgraf, who did not know Weisberg but liked the series, suggested to Weisberg that he work alongside Joel Fields as co-showrunner and the other head writer. Fields, in turn, persuaded TV writer Joshua Brand, with whom he had been working on a new pilot, to join the show's writing team as consulting producer shortly after the start; between them, Weisberg, Fields, and Brand wrote or co-wrote ten of the first season's thirteen episodes. In the second season, Gibson wrote one episode, and the show added other producers to the writing team: screenwriter and journalist Stephen Schiff, playwright and children's book author Peter Ackerman, and playwright Tracey Scott Wilson. All six of those writers (Weisberg, Fields, Brand, Schiff, Ackerman, and Wilson) remained with the show throughout its run. In addition, playwright and Americans story editor Hilary Bettis was added to the writing staff in season 5, and Americans script coordinator Justin Weinberger and showrunner's assistant Sarah Nolen were added to the writing staff in the sixth and final season.

Use of Russian language
The main characters of the show, despite being Soviet KGB officers, have to behave as American-born citizens, and therefore do not generally speak Russian on-screen. Other Soviet agents, immigrants and—later in the show—ordinary Soviet people, converse in Russian. Joe Weisberg explained that achieving believable Russian pronunciation was very important because the show was "so much centered on the world of the Russian Russians and the Russian illegals". In most cases, Russian was the native language for the actors playing Soviet characters. Other actors mastered their lines to sound almost native. In particular, Peter von Berg, who played Vasili Nikolayevich, has experience with Russian plays and was an accent coach. General Zhukov was played by a Polish actor. Annet Mahendru, who played Nina, has a Russian mother and speaks six languages. Mahendru praised Matthew Rhys for his efforts in delivering a few phrases in Russian, adding: "It's really important to everyone, so they're all trying, but it's a difficult language for all of us — even those of us who are fluent in it!"

Weisberg underscored the importance of the authenticity. According to him, there were "some perfectly good people [in the Rezidentura] who were easy to relate to even if you didn't believe in the cause they were serving". He concluded: "Once you bring that level of detail into a show, you can't do cardboard cutouts anymore. You're not in the realm of cliché. You will invariably build a real person."

Filming and locations
The series filmed in New York City at Eastern Effects Studios in Gowanus, Brooklyn, with Brooklyn street locations in Boerum Hill, Carroll Gardens and Cobble Hill. Other shooting locations included: Prospect Park, Astoria, Washington Heights, Mamaroneck, Coney Island Avenue, Kew Gardens, Morningside Heights, Farmingdale, and Staten Island. Shooting of the pilot episode began in May 2012 and lasted until mid-June. Filming began for the rest of the first season in November 2012 in the New York City area. The production used location shots to simulate a dramatic setting of Washington, D.C. Early filming was delayed by flooding caused by Hurricane Sandy. Filming for the second season commenced in October 2013. Some scenes in the fifth and sixth seasons were filmed in Moscow.

Release

Broadcast
The Americans aired internationally in Australia on Network Ten, Canada on FX Canada, Ireland on RTÉ Two, and the United Kingdom on ITV. ITV dropped the series in January 2015 and did not acquire the third season. On July 20, 2015, ITV acquired seasons three and four for their subscription channel ITV Encore.

Home media
Season 1 was released on DVD and Blu-ray Disc in Region 1 on February 11, 2014, in region 2 on March 24, 2014, and in region 4 on February 5, 2014. Special features include audio commentary on "The Colonel" by Joe Weisberg, Joel Fields and Noah Emmerich; three featurettes: "Executive Order 2579: Exposing the Americans", "Perfecting the Art of Espionage", and "Ingenuity Over Technology"; gag reel; and deleted scenes.

Season 2 was released on DVD only, because the Blu-ray release of season 1 did not have enough sales to justify the format. The Region 1 version was released on December 16, 2014. The Region 2 version was released on January 26, 2015. Special features include two featurettes: "Operation Ghost Stories: The Real Directorate 'S'" and "Shades of Red: The Mortality of the Americans"; gag reel; and deleted scenes.

Season 3 was released on DVD in Region 1 on March 1, 2016. Special features include deleted scenes and a featurette titled "The Cold War for Paige".

Season 4 was released on DVD in Region 1 on March 7, 2017. Special features include extended and deleted scenes.

Season 5 was released on DVD in Region 1 on March 27, 2018. Special features include deleted scenes and a gag reel.

Season 6 was released on DVD in Region 1 on October 23, 2018, and a complete series boxset was released on February 5, 2019.

Reception

Critical response

Over the course of its run, the series received widespread critical acclaim, with several publications naming it the best show on television. The American Film Institute listed The Americans as one of the top ten television series of 2013, 2014, 2015, 2016 and 2018.

Brian Tallerico from RogerEbert.com argued that while there are many good shows in the era of Peak TV, The Americans was the greatest then on television, and "one of the few that earns the capital-G Great title". Insider named it one of the "50 TV shows everyone should watch in their lifetime".

After it ended its six-season run, Tim Goodman from The Hollywood Reporter considered The Americans to be among the "Hall of Fame" dramas, and stated it was one of his top 5 favorite television dramas of all-time. IndieWire and Paste named it the best FX TV series of all-time. The New York Times named the series one of the best 20 TV dramas since The Sopranos. Vice called it "The Sopranos of this decade". Carrie Wittmer from Business Insider declared it one of the greatest series ever and "the end of TV's Golden Age". In September 2019, The Guardian ranked the show 43rd on its list of the 100 best TV shows of the 21st century, stating that the "gorgeous, slow-burning drama" was "terminally overlooked in favour of flashier, flimsier fare". In September 2022, Rolling Stone ranked the show 14th on its list of the 100 greatest TV shows of all time.

Season 1
The first season of The Americans received positive reviews from critics. On Rotten Tomatoes, it received an 88 percent approval rating with an average score of 7.86 out of 10 based on 51 reviews, with a critics' consensus of: "The Americans is a spy thriller of the highest order, with evocative period touches and strong chemistry between its leads." Metacritic scored the show a 78 out of 100 based on 35 reviews, indicating "generally favorable reviews". The American Film Institute listed it as one of the top ten television series of 2013. Rob Brunner of Entertainment Weekly described it as "an absorbing spy thriller" while David Hinkley of the New York Daily News praised the pace, noting that "It's a premise that requires as much clever dramatic footwork as you might expect, and creator Joe Weisberg, a former CIA agent, handles the challenge". Verne Gay of Newsday called it a "smart newcomer with a pair of leads that turns The Americans into a likely winner" and gave it a grade of an "A−".

Some reviews were not as optimistic. The Washington Post was cautious in its outlook, stating "it's easy to see how stale it might get in a matter of episodes." Salon would have traded sex scenes for a serious conversation about Reagan's persona and policies. Variety, while finding the concept "intriguing and provocative", ultimately concluded that "[t]he execution ... isn't worthy of the premise."

Matt Zoller Seitz of Vulture liked "how The Americans isolates and magnifies true feelings in dishonest situations". Comparing the "high and violent" first season of The Americans full of "fights and guns and explosions" to Homeland he expressed high hopes about the next season "for one big reason: where Homelands first season hinged mainly on a relationship between two specific characters, Carrie and Brody, in a specific situation (hunter and hunted in love), The Americans is primarily about the idea of partnership, marriage but also mentorship, friendship and professional camaraderie. It's at once more thematically specific and more dramatically wide-ranging than Homeland. As a result, it feels at once more rooted and more free."

Season 2

The second season received critical acclaim. On Rotten Tomatoes, it received a 97 percent approval rating with an average score of 8.83 out of 10 based on 38 reviews, with a critics consensus of: "Adding fuel to the fire, The Americans retains all the suspense and action of season one while enhancing the level of excitement... and wigs." Metacritic scored the show an 88 out of 100 based on 31 reviews, indicating "universal acclaim". Several entities have rated the show among the best television for 2014, including the American Film Institute, The A.V. Club, and Grantland.

Tim Goodman of The Hollywood Reporter called the series "one of television's finest dramas" and praised the ability of the writers in "nailing down season two ... by picking up where the story left off and making sure that this spy-vs.-spy thing has real-life costs." Rob Owen of the Pittsburgh Post-Gazette praised the series for doing "the near-impossible of making viewers cheer for Russian spies in America and at the same time for the American FBI agents who are trying to unmask those Russians living in suburbia." Alan Sepinwall of HitFix praised the second season, stating how the show has, "taken a major creative leap—the kind that can elevate a show from a strong example of its era to one that transcends eras."

Mary McNamara of the Los Angeles Times did not approve of its portrayal of the children, expressing concern for how viewers are expected to accept the dangerous situations the children are placed in while the show continues to use crime and violence to advance the story in The Americans and other like-minded shows. The New York Daily News questioned its survivability: "Credibility starts to fray when our heroes, or anti-heroes, keep needing miraculous last-second evasions and escapes." Eric Goldman of IGN felt that the murder of another undercover couple "gave the season an underlying mystery element" and served as "the theme of protecting your children from the spy world".

Season 3
On Rotten Tomatoes, the third season received a 100% approval rating with an average score of 9.03 out of 10 based on 53 reviews, with a critics consensus of: "Family-driven drama and psychological themes propel The Americans tautly drawn tension, dispensing thrills of a different ilk this season." Metacritic lists a score of 92 out of 100 based on 23 reviews, indicating "universal acclaim". Alessandra Stanley's review in The New York Times states that, "'The Americans' is an unusually clever, subtle drama that uses the conventions of a Cold War thriller to paint a portrait of a complicated, evolving but not unhappy marriage...[E]very season gets more complicated, and is all the better for it." Maureen Ryan of The Huffington Post declared that the first four episodes were "every bit as taut and finely crafted as the stellar prior season of the show." Emily VanDerWerff of Vox said "The Americans is in the kind of incredible stretch of episodes TV dramas sometimes hit in the middle of their runs" and that it is "on one of the best runs of episodes in TV drama history."

The "visceral" third season where "everyone lies" left Helen Verongos of The New York Times "more paranoid than ever", with "Elizabeth and Philip's worst fears have been realized". For them, according to Laura Hudson of Vulture, "intimacy is secrecy; for Paige, intimacy is truth".

Season 4
The fourth season received widespread acclaim from critics. On Rotten Tomatoes, it received a 99% approval rating with an average score of 9.22 out of 10 based on 48 reviews, with a critics consensus of: "With its fourth season, The Americans continues to deliver top-tier spy drama while sending its characters in directions that threaten to destroy their freedoms—and their lives." On Metacritic, the season has a score of 95 out of 100 based on 28 reviews, indicating "universal acclaim". Brian Tallerico of RogerEbert.com praised the series and wrote, "It is that depth of character and nuance in the writing that elevates The Americans, along with its willingness to offer stunning narrative developments. [...] I'm now convinced that when we close the final chapter of this televised novel we may finally appreciate one of the best shows we've ever seen."

James Poniewozik of The New York Times characterized the fourth season as a melancholy "catalog of loss", which adds "a note of gloom even to the tensest moments in this drama". He found similarities between The Americans and Breaking Bad, but ultimately concluded that "maybe The Americans is neither Breaking Bad nor a traditional spy story. Maybe it's a teenage horror movie, the kind where the biggest danger, in the end, is already inside your own house", referring to coming-of-age Paige becoming disillusioned, discovering secrets about her parents.

Season 5
On Rotten Tomatoes, season five received a 94% approval rating with an average score of 9.03 out of 10 based on 39 reviews, with a critics' consensus of: "In its penultimate season, The Americans brings long-simmering storylines to a boil while heightening the spy-thriller stakes and deepening the domestic drama—all brought vividly to life by superb performances from its veteran cast." On Metacritic, the season has a score of 94 out of 100 based on 19 reviews, indicating "universal acclaim". Matthew Gilbert of The Boston Globe gave it a highly positive review and wrote, "The drama remains as tense as ever, with strong, careful writing and an abundance of fine performances." Tim Goodman of The Hollywood Reporter also lauded the series, "It's extremely well-constructed, with slow-burning storylines that are paying off in superb dramatic depth" and praised its "top-tier acting" and "artfully crafted visuals". Prior to the premiere of this season, The Playlist wrote about how the show would end up standing with The Wire and Breaking Bad as one of the best TV dramas ever made.

Some critics expected the fifth season to culminate in a "disastrous eruption". But, as the season progressed, some criticized it for turning "slow burn" into just "warm embers", morphing into a season about "people staring off into the distance, stirring tea, keeping their thoughts to themselves and worrying quite a lot about grain supply". According to Fields and Weisberg, they wanted the fifth season "to feel different as it unspooled", harvesting the story pieces created in the fourth season. Pacing of the fifth season was slowed down intentionally, but was not meant as a set-up for the sixth season. Weisberg and Fields admitted that they did not expect "this much of a backlash" for "hitting the brakes too hard". They were upset by criticism, but suggested waiting until the series is over, hoping for the response to become more muted in context of the sixth and the final season.

After the series ended, many reconsidered the fifth season. Travis Clark of Business Insider said the end of the series made him reconsider what he initially thought was the weakest and most disappointing season of the show. Particularly, he thought that the garage scene from the series finale would have not been as effective without the groundwork done in the fifth season in terms of Philip's character development.

Season 6
On Rotten Tomatoes, the sixth season received a 99% approval rating with an average score of 9.26 out of 10 based on 32 reviews, with a critics consensus of: "The Americans powerful final season pumps up the volume on an already intense show, concluding the complex series arc with epic familial conflict... and a high body count." On Metacritic, the season has a score of 92 out of 100 based on 18 reviews, indicating "universal acclaim".

Voxs Emily VanDerWerff named it one of the best final seasons ever made. Matt Brennan from Paste echoed the sentiment: "The Americans to its most consequential moment, and in the midst of a final season that so far deserves consideration alongside Breaking Bads, The Sopranos, and a handful of others' as the medium's all-time best."

The series finale, "START", was critically acclaimed as one of the best finales of all time.

Accolades

Over the course of the series, The Americans received 18 Emmy nominations. For its fourth and sixth seasons, the series was nominated for Outstanding Drama Series. Keri Russell and Matthew Rhys were each nominated for Outstanding Lead Actress and Actor in a Drama Series, respectively, for the fourth, fifth, and sixth seasons. Rhys won the award for the sixth season. The prior omissions that the show had received at the Emmys were considered to be snubs by the Emmys in the drama and acting categories by critics. Margo Martindale was nominated four times and won twice for Outstanding Guest Actress in a Drama Series, and Alison Wright received a nomination in the same category for the fifth season. The show received four nominations for Outstanding Writing for a Drama Series, for "Do Mail Robots Dream of Electric Sheep?" written by Joshua Brand; and Joel Fields and Joe Weisberg were nominated for the award three consecutive years for the fourth, fifth, and sixth-season finales. Fields and Weisberg won the award for the series finale, "START". Nathan Barr also received a nomination for Outstanding Original Main Title Theme Music for the first season.

The Americans was strongly praised for its writing. The series was nominated for four Writers Guild of America Award for Television: Dramatic Series awards, and won in both 2016 and 2018. The Americans won a rare second Peabody Award, "for ending one of TV's best dramas with one of the television's best series finales", becoming the first drama series since Breaking Bad to win two Peabody Awards during its run.

See also
 Illegals Program, ten Russian sleeper agents under non-official cover arrested in 2010 by the FBI
 Jack Barsky, former KGB sleeper agent
 Deutschland 83

Notes

References

External links

 
 

 
Fiction set in 1981
2010s American drama television series
2013 American television series debuts
2018 American television series endings
Television series about the Cold War
English-language television shows
Espionage television series
FX Networks original programming
Peabody Award-winning television programs
Primetime Emmy Award-winning television series
KGB in fiction
Serial drama television series
Television series set in the 1980s
Television series about totalitarianism
Television shows directed by Steph Green
Television shows filmed in New York (state)
Television shows set in Moscow
Television shows set in Washington, D.C.
Television series by Amblin Entertainment
Television series by DreamWorks Television
Television series by 20th Century Fox Television
Best Drama Series Golden Globe winners
American spy thriller television series
American spy drama television series